Ira Williams (1894–1977) was an American chemist at DuPont's Jackson Laboratory in New Jersey, who in 1930 made commercial Neoprene possible by producing a soft, plastic form of chloroprene that could be processed by the rubber industry.

He won the 1946 Charles Goodyear Medal.

References

20th-century American chemists
Polymer scientists and engineers
1894 births
1977 deaths